Redwick is a small village and community (parish) to the south east of the city of Newport, in Wales, United Kingdom.  It lies within the Newport city boundaries, in the historic county of Monmouthshire and the preserved county of Gwent. in 2011 the population was 206.

Location 

Redwick is located 6 miles (9.5 km) south east of the centre of Newport and some 4 miles (6.5 km) south west of Caldicot, Monmouthshire on the flat coastal lands reclaimed from the Severn Estuary and Bristol Channel and part of the Caldicot and Wentloog Levels.

The Church 

The ancient parish church of Church of St Thomas, Redwick is a Grade I listed building. It is notable for many unusual features. An earlier dedication, when it belonged to Tintern Abbey, appears to have been to St. Michael. It is held with Magor.

The church is unusually large for a parish church on the Caldicot and Wentloog Levels, perhaps second only in its grandeur to that at Peterstone. The church has a full-immersion baptistry, unique medieval stone carvings and a fine Victorian pipe organ salvaged from two previous churches. On the ancient south porch is a distinctive 'scratch post' or "Mass sundial" and (like the church at nearby Goldcliff) has a mark indicating the flood level of the water inundation caused by the Bristol Channel flood, 1607. The handsome font originates from the 13th century and may have been an original feature.

Its embattled and pinnacled central tower contain six bells, the fourth and fifth of which are pre-Reformation bells from the Bristol foundry, dated circa 1350-80  making them some of the oldest church bells working anywhere in the country. Most unusually, following their lowering in the tower in the 1990s, the bells are rung from the chancel in full view of the congregation, although a number of old unused rope bosses suggest that this must have also been the case at some time in the past. The newest bell is the treble (lightest bell) which was added in celebration of Queen Elizabeth II's 40 years on the throne.

The fine East window, which contains some painted glass from about 1870, unlike the roof and the other windows, escaped the nearby German Luftwaffe bomb blast of 1942. The restoration and re-modelling on the church, including the attractive raised tiled floor, in 1875, was by John Norton who later also participated in the building of the exquisite chapel at Tyntesfield in Somerset.

Notable features 

The village pub is the Rose Inn, a free house situated on South Row. In May 2011, after a four-year wait, a grant of £316,323 from the Big Lottery Fund was confirmed, alongside £200,000 from the Welsh Assembly, for the replacement of the existing 60-year-old Village Hall.

Whitehall Farm/Redbrick House

The earliest church records show that there was a house, then called Whitehall Farm, on the site since 1450. The main Georgian façade was built around 1795, by MP William Phillips. Phillips, built the Brick House ready for his son's return to Britain from the American Colonies. The son, also named William, never returned, however, as the ship carrying him home was wrecked in a storm before reaching Britain and he was drowned. The house is now a guest house.

Archaeology 

Insects from samples of Bronze Age timber buildings on the foreshore at Redwick have been examined by Smith and colleagues. Four rectangular buildings of middle Bronze Age date
have also been excavated on inter-tidal peat at Redwick - such buildings appear to have been used during seasonal pastoral activity on the wetland. Martin Bell and colleagues from the University of Reading have studied Mesolithic to Neolithic coastal environmental change at Redwick.

History

The church registers, which date from 1787, contain an unpleasant reminder of legal processes of not so very long ago. The last man to be hanged for sheep stealing in Monmouthshire was charged before local magistrates assembled at The Great House in the village.

Salem Baptist Chapel was erected in 1832. By 1851, when the minister was Thomas Leonard, morning attendance was 21, with 13 scholars, and evening attendance was 68. In 1994 the building was converted into a private residence.

Government 

The area is in the Llanwern electoral ward and governed by the Newport City Council. 

Redwick also has its own community council.

References

External links

Redwick, St. Thomas' Church, Monumental Inscriptions

Communities in Newport, Wales
Villages in Newport, Wales